Peter William Bruder (March 14, 1908 – May 16, 1976) was an American fencer. He competed in the individual and team sabre events at the 1932 and 1936 Summer Olympics.

References

External links
 

1908 births
1976 deaths
American male sabre fencers
Olympic fencers of the United States
Fencers at the 1932 Summer Olympics
Fencers at the 1936 Summer Olympics
Sportspeople from Brooklyn